Facility may refer to:

 A place for doing something, or a place that facilitates an activity:
 A commercial or institutional building, such as a hotel, resort, school, office complex, sports arena, or convention center
 Medical facility
 Post-production facility
 Telecommunications facility
 "Facilities" or "The Facilities" can be a euphemism for a public restroom

See also 
 
 
 Faculty (disambiguation)

fr:Complexe